Pardinho is a municipality in the state of São Paulo in Brazil. The population is 6,508 (2020 est.) in an area of 210 km². The elevation is 898 m. Pardinho became an independent municipality in 1959, when it was separated from Botucatu.

References

Municipalities in São Paulo (state)
Populated places established in 1959